Arthur O'Sullivan (born 1953) is an American economist, Professor of Economics at Lewis & Clark College, and author of college textbooks on economics.

Works
Sole author
 Urban Economics, Irwin / McGraw-Hill Series in Urban Economics, 1990 (First Edition) – 2008 (Seventh Edition). 

With Steven M. Sheffrin
 Economics: Principles in Action, Pearson Prentice Hall, 2003. 
 Microeconomics: Principles and Tools, Prentice-Hall, 2004.

References

21st-century American economists
Living people
1953 births
Lewis & Clark College faculty